Rogelio Alejandro Flores Mejía (born 29 January 1969) is a Mexican politician affiliated with the National Action Party. As of 2014, he served as Deputy of the LIX Legislature of the Mexican Congress representing Puebla.

References

1969 births
Living people
People from Puebla
National Action Party (Mexico) politicians
Deputies of the LIX Legislature of Mexico
Members of the Chamber of Deputies (Mexico) for Puebla